Lyncina lynx, common name : the lynx cowry or eyed cowry, is a species of sea snail, a cowry, a marine gastropod mollusk in the family Cypraeidae, the cowries.

Description
Lyncina lynx is quite common. The shells of these cowries are very variabile in pattern and size. The dorsum surface of these  smooth and shiny shells is generally pale brown, pale purple or grey, densely covered with small and large dark brown or purple dots. The large spots are extended to the edges. The base is white or pale brown. The aperture is long and narrow, with several white teeth and a bright reddish spacing. In the living cowries the mantle is transparent, with tree-shaped white sensorial papillae and may cover the entire shell.

Distribution
This species occurs in the Red Sea, in the Indian Ocean along South-East  Africa (Aldabra, Chagos, Kenya, Madagascar, the Mascarene Basin, Mauritius, Réunion, the Seychelles, Zanzibar and Tanzania) and in the western  Pacific Ocean (Philippines, Japan, Taiwan, western and northern Australia, Polynesia and Hawaii).

Habitat
These cowries live in tropical shallow water, subtidal and intertidal, usually under rocks or corals up to about of depth. They start feeding at dusk, mainly on sponges.

Subspecies
Cypraea lynx var. williamsi Melvill, 1888
Cypraea (Luponia) lynx globosa Dautzenberg, 1902
Cypraea lynx var.michaelis Melvill, 1905
Cypraea lynx var. incrassata Dautzenberg, 1929
Lyncina lynx pacifica Steadman & Cotton, 1943
Cypraea (Lyncina) lynx var. javana Coen, 1949

References

 Lorenz F. & Hubert A. (2000) A guide to worldwide cowries. Edition 2. Hackenheim: Conchbooks. 584 pp
 Burgess, C.M. (1970). The Living Cowries. AS Barnes and Co, Ltd. Cranbury, New Jersey

External links
 Biolib
 
 Lyncina lynx
 Clade
 

Cypraeidae
Gastropods described in 1758
Taxa named by Carl Linnaeus